"Eyes Wide Open" is a song recorded by American singer Sabrina Carpenter from her debut studio album of the same name (2015), served as the opening track of the album. The track was written by Audra Mae, Meghan Kabir and its producer Jerrod Bettis. Mitch Allan helped Bettis on the production and produced the vocals while Dan Book served as an additional vocal producer. The song was released by Hollywood Records as the second single from Eyes Wide Open, being able to purchase a week before the album’s release on April 7, 2015. "Eyes Wide Open" is a midtempo pop rock and power pop song backed by catchy background vocals, a piano and a simple bass beat. In the song, Carpenter talks about finding who she is and finding her path. According to Carpenter, the song is her favorite on the album.

It was accompanied by a music video directed by Sarah McClung premiered on her Vevo channel on June 14, 2015. It featured Carpenter walking through an unknown building and performing the song in a room with her band and her sister Sarah Carpenter. Carpenter promoted "Eyes Wide Open" with several live performances, including on Radio Disney Music Awards 2015, where she did a medley with her single “We'll Be the Stars”. The song won a Radio Disney Music Award in the category "Best Anthem" in 2016.

Background and recording
Carpenter made the lead track off of the album available for those who pre-ordered the album on iTunes on April 7, 2015. The song was one of the last to be recorded, when Carpenter started to learn who she really was and when she wanted something more soulful for her album, that's the reason why the song is different from the rest of the record. In an interview with Justine Magazine, Carpenter said that "Eyes Wide Open" was her favorite track of the album.

"Eyes Wide Open" was written somewhere in late 2014 and early 2015 by Jerrod Bettis, Audra Mae and Meghan Kabir. The song was produced by Bettis and Mitch Allan, the last one served as a vocal producer and Dan Book served as an additional vocal producer. Tony Maserati mixed the track and the recording session took place at The Guest House, located in North Hollywood, California. Bettis and Scott Robinson served as additional engineers. The track was programmed by Allan and Bettis and Allan plays guitars and bass. Kabir and Allan contributed backing vocals to the track. The song was mastered by Eric Boulanger at The Mastering Lab, Inc., located in Ojai, California.

Composition and lyrical interpretation

Musically, "Eyes Wide Open" is a three minutes and thirteen seconds piano-driven midtempo pop rock song with power pop elements. In terms of music notation, "Eyes Wide Open" was composed using  common time in the key of F minor, with a moderate tempo of 88 beats per minute. The song follows the chord progression of Fm–D-A and Carpenter's vocal range spans from the low note A3 to the high note of E5, giving the song one octave and four notes of range.  The production of the song is backed by catchy background vocals, a piano and a simple bass beat. In the chorus, the song gain guitars and percussion elements.

Lyrically, the song demonstrates a "darker mood" where Carpenter sings about finding who she is and her path. Carpenter's favorite lyric of her debut studio album is the opening lyric of "Eyes Wide Open" that says "Everybody loves to tell me / I was born an old soul", that means Carpenter likes things from another time period. The song proceeds with the line "Better keep my eyes wide open / There’s so much that I don’t know" where Carpenter is singing about keeping her mind and eyes open and don't miss any opportunities. In the chorus, "I keep my eyes wide open / Bless this ground unbroken / I’m about to make my way / Heaven help me keep my faith / And my eyes wide open", Carpenter is asking for guidance and faith. In the second verse, the line "This dream burns inside of me / And I can’t just let it go", Carpenter decides to keep on going albeit with caution.

Music video

Background and release
The music video was directed by Sarah McColgan and it was premiered on Vevo and YouTube on June 14, 2015. The behind the scenes of the music video was premiered on July 17, 2015 in the same platforms and it features her sister Sarah Carpenter. A lyric video was premiered on YouTube on July 29, 2015 and it features various scenes of California streets.

Critical reception
Dolph Malone of Headline Planet criticized the song as an emotionless song, but technically correct. He said "[...] “We’ll Be the Stars” and “Eyes Wide Open” are two of the album’s weaker moments. [...] The latter is the generic pop fodder one would expect of a technically proficient but emotionally vacant artist. Neither label describes Carpenter. As a result, both songs serve to mute what actually makes her special." Taylor Weatherby of Billboard pointed ""Eyes Wide Open" as one of Carpenter's best songs by saying "[...] "Eyes Wide Open" served as her declaration of independence that showed the world she was ready for what was to come despite her young age. The lyrics in themselves are powerful enough ("All I have is just this moment / And I don't want to miss a second / 'Cause it could all be gone in an instant"), but with the anthemic beat she put behind it, Carpenter seems unstoppable with this track."

Live performances
"Eyes Wide Open" was first performed on Radio Disney Music Awards 2015, where she did a medley with her single “We'll Be the Stars”. She performed the song at D23 Expo in 2015 along with "Take on the World", "Can't Blame a Girl for Trying", a cover of "FourFiveSeconds", "The Middle of Starting Over" and "We'll Be the Stars". The song was also performed on YTV Summer Beach Bash II, in August, 2015. In 2016, Carpenter performed the song on the Honda Stage at the iHeartRadio Theater LA along with some covers and songs from his first and second album. The song was part of her debut headline tour, being the fifteenth song to be performed. The song was included on The De-Tour being the thirteenth song to be performed.

Credits and personnel
Recording and management
Recorded at The Guest House (North Hollywood, California)
Mastered at The Mastering Lab, Inc. (Ojai, California)
WB Music Corp. (ASCAP), Margetts Road Music (ASCAP) and Asternaut (ASCAP) All Rights obo Itself and Margetts Road Music and Asternaut administered by WB Music Corp., WB Music Corp. (ASCAP) and AMAEB (ASCAP) All Rights obo Itself and AMAEB administered by WB Music Corp., Songs Music Publishing LLC obo SHAHNAZ Publishing and Songs of SMP (ASCAP)

Personnel

Sabrina Carpenter – lead vocals
Jerrod Bettis – songwriting, production, additional engineering, drum programming
Audra Mae – songwriting
Meghan Kabir – songwriting, backing vocals
Mitch Allan – production, vocal production, guitars, bass, programming, backing vocals
Dan Book – additional vocal production
Scott Robinson – additional engineering
Tony Maserati – mixing
Eric Boulanger – mastering

Credits adapted from Eyes Wide Open liner notes.

Awards and nominations

Release history

References

2015 singles
2015 songs
Sabrina Carpenter songs
Songs written by Audra Mae
Hollywood Records singles
Songs written by Jerrod Bettis